Redding Athletic Football Club was a Scottish association football club based in the village of Redding, Stirlingshire. The club was founded in 1886 and disbanded in 1892. The club qualified for the Scottish Cup for one season in 1887–88 and also competed in the regional Stirlingshire Cup competition. The club's home colours were black and blue striped shirts with white shorts.

References 

Defunct football clubs in Scotland
Association football clubs established in 1886
1886 establishments in Scotland
Association football clubs disestablished in 1892
1892 disestablishments in Scotland